GSL may refer to:

Companies and organizations
 Geological Society of London, a learned society in the United Kingdom
 Ghana School of Law, an educational institution for training lawyers in Ghana
 Global Securities Lending, a financial trade magazine for the securities lending industry
 Goa Shipyard Limited, an Indian shipyard
 Govan Shipbuilders Limited, a British shipbuilding company
 Group Scout Leader, adult leader of a Scout group in the United Kingdom

Entertainment
 Game System License, a trademark license for Dungeons & Dragons
 Global StarCraft II League, an e-Sport tournament
 Gold Standard Laboratories, a record label
 Kamen Rider Kabuto: God Speed Love, 2006 movie based on the Kamen Rider Kabuto series

Language
 Gambian Sign Language, a national sign language used by the deaf community of Gambia
 Georgian Sign Language, the national sign language of the deaf in the country of Georgia
 German Sign Language, the sign language of the deaf community in Germany
 Ghandruk Sign Language, a village sign language of the village of Ghandruk in central Nepal
 Greek Sign Language, the sign language of the Greek deaf community
 General Service List, a list of common words in English

Transport
 Taltheilei Narrows Airport (IATA code: GSL), an airport in Northwest Territories, Canada
 Gunnislake railway station (National Rail code: GSL), a station in Cornwall, UK

Other uses
 General sales list, a legal category of drugs in the UK (over-the-counter)
 General Service List, a list of basic English words for language learners
 Georgia State League, former American Class D professional baseball league
 Glycosphingolipids, a subtype of glycolipids containing the amino alcohol sphingosine
 GNU Scientific Library, a software library for applied mathematics and science
 Great Salt Lake, a salt water lake in Utah

See also
 Gaius Salvius Liberalis

ko:GSL